John Lenthall may refer to:

 John Lenthall (Roundhead) (c. 1625–1681), English lawyer and member of parliament who was granted a baronetcy under the protectorate
 John Lenthall (shipbuilder) (1807–1882), American naval architect and shipbuilder
, United States Navy fleet replenishment oiler in service since 1987

Lenthall, John